Petar Miloš (born 11 April 1941) is a Croatian boxer. He competed in the men's heavyweight event at the 1968 Summer Olympics. At the 1968 Summer Olympics, he lost to Kiril Pandov of Bulgaria.

References

1941 births
Living people
Heavyweight boxers
Croatian male boxers
Yugoslav male boxers
Olympic boxers of Yugoslavia
Boxers at the 1968 Summer Olympics
People from Drniš